Gendün is a Tibetan personal name meaning "sangha". Gendün is its spelling in the Tournadre and THDL Simplified transcription systems; it is also written Dge-'dun in Wylie transliteration, Gêdün in Tibetan pinyin, Gendun, Gedun or Gedhun.

Notable persons whose names include "Gendün" include:
Gendun Drub, the 1st Dalai Lama
Gendun Gyatso, the 2nd Dalai Lama
Gedhun Choekyi Nyima, the 11th Panchen Lama according to Tibetan exile groups
Gendun Chöphel, a monk, scholar, and political prisoner
Gendun Rinpoche, a notable Karma Kagyu lama

See also
 Genden (disambiguation)